Jena Marie Griswold (born October 2, 1984) is an American attorney and politician from the state of Colorado. A Democrat, she is the 39th Colorado Secretary of State, serving since January 8, 2019.

Early life and career 
Griswold was born in Toledo, Ohio, and moved to Estes Park, Colorado at the age of 10. She graduated from Estes Park High School in 2002. She graduated from Whitman College magna cum laude with a Bachelor of Arts in Politics and Spanish Literature in 2006. She graduated from the University of Pennsylvania Law School with a Juris Doctor in 2011. In 2006, Griswold was awarded the Watson Foundation Fellowship, and in 2009, the Penn Law International Human Rights Fellowship.

Griswold moved to Washington, D.C. in 2011, and worked for President Barack Obama's 2012 campaign as a voter protection attorney. In 2013, Governor John Hickenlooper appointed her to be his liaison to the federal government.

Secretary of State of Colorado 
In the 2018 general election, Griswold ran for Secretary of State of Colorado. She defeated the incumbent Republican Wayne Williams in the November 6 general election to become the first elected Democratic Secretary of State in Colorado since 1963 and the first woman from the Democratic Party to ever hold the office.

Griswold has prioritized campaign finance reform and increasing voter registration. She filed suit to prevent Tina Peters from being able to oversee elections in Mesa County in 2021 and 2022 due to her attempt to interfere in the 2020 U.S. presidential election.

Griswold won a second term in the 2022 elections, defeating Republican Pam Anderson, a former county clerk and recorder from Jefferson County, with 55 percent of the vote.

Political future 
In 2019, it was reported that Griswold was considering a bid for United States Senate in the 2020 election against Republican incumbent Cory Gardner. She launched an exploratory committee for the position in July 2019. Griswold ultimately declined to run.

Personal life 
Griswold lives in Louisville, Colorado. Griswold is Jewish.

Electoral history

References

External links

Government website
Campaign website

Colorado Democrats
Jewish American people in Colorado politics
Jewish women politicians
Living people
People from Estes Park, Colorado
People from Louisville, Colorado
Political campaign staff
Political staffers
Secretaries of State of Colorado
University of Pennsylvania Law School alumni
Whitman College alumni
1984 births
21st-century American politicians
21st-century American women politicians
21st-century American Jews